Ann Nooney (1893 or 1900 – 1964 or 1975) was an American printmaker. She was a participant in the 1930s Federal Works program (WPA), in and around New York City. Her work is included in the collections of the Smithsonian American Art Museum,
the Metropolitan Museum of Art 
and the Art Institute of Chicago.

Gallery

References

External links

19th-century births
Year of birth uncertain
20th-century deaths
Year of death uncertain
20th-century American women artists
Works Progress Administration in New York (state)
American women printmakers
20th-century American printmakers
Artists from New York City